Djarum Black (stylised as DJARUM BL∆CK) is an Indonesian brand of clove cigarettes and cigars, currently owned and manufactured by Djarum.

History
It is sold in a stretched pack, two cigarettes wide and ten cigarettes long. The cigarette itself is black, flavored paper. The cigarette features a clove flavor both in scent and taste, and the paper has a sweet taste. It is made with natural Indonesian tobacco, and is widely distributed throughout the world.

Legal status in the United States
A federal law passed in the United States in 2009 has made it illegal for tobacco shops and stores to carry cigarettes that contain flavors other than menthol.  The law affects the Djarum Black cigarette brand and has made it unavailable for purchase within the United States.

Now to purchase any type of kretek it must be classified as a cigar. The current Djarum Black cloves are now rolled in tobacco paper.  As of 2010, in the United States Djarum Blacks are available again in smaller 12-pack cigars, which are much thicker than the cigarettes that come in 20 packs.

Markets
Djarum Black cigarettes were or still are sold in the following countries: Brazil, United Kingdom, Austria, Poland, India and Indonesia, Romania.

References

Indonesian cigarette brands